The Carnival of Awussu, or in French carnaval d'Aoussou, is an annual festive and cultural event that unfolds each 24th of July in Sousse, Tunisia.

It's a parade of symbolic chariots, fanfares and folk groups from Tunisia and elsewhere which takes place near the beach of Boujaafar, at the eve of the beginning of 'Awussu (The word designating the heat wave of the month of August according to the Berber calendar). Originally it was a Pagan feast (Neptunalia) celebrating the god of the seas, Neptune in the Roman province of Africa, and might even go back to Phoenician times : the appellation Awussu is a possible deformation of Oceanus. The cult transformed as time unfold and lost all religious connotations. In the modern era, prior to the Tunisian revolution, the festival was used for political propaganda. 

In 2014, it was canceled for organizational and financial reasons, but celebrations of the festival resumed in 2015.

References

Festivals in Tunisia
July observances
Parades in Africa
Summer events in Tunisia